The Fur (Fur: fòòrà, Arabic: فور Fūr) are an ethnic group predominantly inhabiting western Sudan. They are concentrated in the Darfur region, where they are the largest ethnic group. They speak the Fur language, which belongs to the Nilo-Saharan family.

Overview

The Fur are the largest ethnic group in the Darfur region of western Sudan. They are also sometimes referred to by the names Fora, Fordunga, Furawi, Konjara, or Kungara. They are an active agricultural people and may also herd cattle. Some Fur families who have accumulated a substantial cattle herd developed a more nomadic lifestyle like that of their herding neighbors, the Baqqara (Baggara) Arabs. Culturally, those cattle-herding Fur are now considered to be Baqqara. The Fur are nominally Sunni Muslims following the Maliki school of Islamic law.

They are a Western Sudanese people who practice sedentary herding and agriculture, mainly the cultivation of millet. Their society is a traditional one governed by village elders. They speak Fur, a Nilo-Saharan language, and are Muslims, having adopted the religion following the region's conquest by the Kanem-Bornu Empire during the Middle Ages. Some of them have come to speak Arabic in recent years.

The name of Darfur comes from the name of this ethnic group and means "the home of the Fur". Most of the well known governors of Darfur such as Deriage and Tegani Seisei are members of the Fur. The Fur established the historical Sultanate of Darfur which governed Darfur until 1916 (see History of Darfur).
 
Abdul Wahid al Nur, a leader among the Fur, established the Sudan Liberation Movement and Army. Another leader of the Fur, is Ahmed Abdelshafi (Toba).

The traditional heartland of the Fur is the mountainous region around Jebel Sî and Jebel Marra Wadi Salih and Zaligi; today, however, most of them live in the lower country west and southwest of that area, between 11–14 N and 23–26 E. Some Fur live across the border in Chad, many of them refugees.

The Furs' lifestyle has led to conflict with the nomadic Baggara, cattle-herders of the region, concerning access to water and grazing land, particularly in Darfur's central Jebel Marra mountains where the best agricultural land is to be found. This has been the source of ethnic tensions for many years, culminating in the Darfur conflict which began in 2003.

Many Fur villagers were massacred in the ethnic fighting as Mahria and Terjem tribes divided up land they conquered from the Fur, according to a September 3, 2007 New York Times account citing United Nations officials and Fur survivors.

Language

The Fur speak the Fur language, which belongs to the Nilo-Saharan family. They also speak Arabic as a lingua franca.

There is no written or symbolic script for the Fur language. They recently have been using Arabic or Latin characters to put the language in written form. Most Fur people speak Fur fluently as their mother tongue.

Common greetings include:

Avilakona: Good Morning
Avilakamunu: Good Evening

Heavy drums are often used while making speeches and other public addresses.

Art

Handmade art
The Fur people make their own handmade art and utensils. These include talak, which is used for cleaning pots (talak looks like a sponge); birish, which is a carpet for sitting; and gada, which is a wood plate or bowl used for important occasions.

Music, stories and entertainment
Among the Fur people, stories are told to keep children safe from the outside world. These stories are designed to keep children close to home. In some stories children are told that if they go out in the morning they will die from the heat of the sun, and in the night they are told if they go out an animal called nyama will eat them.

Fur music is very popular in their culture. The main instruments are drums. The music is played with a heavy drumbeat that accompanies their celebrations. Some popular Fur musicians are; Abdalla Kioka, Marium Amo and Tour Baréé'ng Kwee.

Architecture
A common type of architecture in homes and buildings is called mud architecture. They dig the clay from the ground, break it up, mix it with water, work thoroughly, and also mix other substances like straw. The clay will then pile up while still wet, pressed on to the scaffolds made out of wood , or cast in molds of various sizes into bricks. When the mud dries up in the molded shape, the process is complete. This technique is applied to most architecture in Western Sudan such as farmhouses, barns, outer walls, palaces, and even mosques. Mud is good at absorbing heat, which is advantageous for cold nights. However, because of its low resistance to wind and rain, there is a constant need to repair buildings. Therefore, the mud architecture is no longer practical because of its fragility, as well as cultural changes and foreign influences.

Attire and body art
Clothes among the Fur people are similar to what is worn in Sudan. They wear casual Sudanese clothes like a jalabiya. The jalabiya is a white garment that covers the wearer from head to toe. A long time ago, when the Fur tribe was Arabised, Fur women used to poke their lower lip many times until the lip starts to swell. These dents were considered a sign of beauty.

Social structure

In the social structure of the Fur people, they do not have so much regard for their wealth. A poor leader and a rich leader can become a chief. The experience of a man is based primarily on his knowledge of the Quran. A man cannot even get married if he does not know a couple pages of this text.

The Quran is studied with the help of a hand-held board shaped object known as the lohh and a wooden stylus called a kalam. The Fur tribesman’s knowledge of the Quran determines their position on the tribe’s hierarchy ladder. For example, a tribesman must know almost the whole book to attain position as chieftain.

The Fur people also have their own crafts for entertainment. These include dance-games like “ALLE” (all-eh) and toys like Burajei. Burajei is a small doll-like toy made from a camel’s back. It is bound by rope and sewn by thorns.

Social behavior

When greeting each other, a woman and a man have different forms of respect. The woman must kneel down before the man and the man must slow his pace. Different sexes can also dance together but are forbidden to touch or live with each other unless they are family.

Men and women usually get married in their late teens to their early twenties. The groom and wife will meet each other and get to know about them, their accomplishments and other important attributes. If everything goes well they will proceed to wed.

Roles of men and women

The men bear the family name. They work to bring money to the family and are responsible for all important decisions related to the family, such as finances and marriages. The women get water, prepare the food and ensure the cleanliness of the home.

Daughters normally help their mothers, milk the cows and stay at home. Sons rear and herd cattle along with the domesticated cows. If either of these two misbehave they are similarly punished by their elders. Also, it is disrespectful look an adult in the eyes.

Eating

Sudan is well known for its Guhwah coffee served from a jebena, a special Sudanese pot. The coffee beans are roasted in this pot over charcoal, then ground with cloves and other spices. The grounds are steeped in hot water and the coffee is served in tiny cups after straining it through a grass sieve.

Tea or chai is also very popular and served in small glasses without milk. Some beverages enjoyed in the non-Islamic areas are Aragi, a clear strong spirit made from dates, merissa, a type of beer and tedj, or wines, made from dates or honey. 
Sudanese cuisine is as varied as its cultures, especially in the south, but it has certain unique characteristics. Millet porridge and fool medamas, a savory dish of mashed fava beans, are popular breakfast foods in the north. Lamb and chicken are often eaten, but pork is prohibited to Muslims.

Wheat and dura sorghum are the staple starches. Breads include the Arabian khubz, and kisra, an omelette-like pancake which is part of the Sudanese dinner. Maschi, a beef and tomato dish, is also typical. Fruits are peeled for dessert and a favourite treat is creme caramel.

In the south, dinner is served on a low, bare table. There may be five or six dishes to dip into with large pieces of flatbread. These dishes are accompanied by a salad and shata, a red-hot spice mixture served in small dishes. After the meal, dessert is served, then tea. On special occasions incense may be lit. The ritual of hospitality is important in Sudan.

Economic base

The Fur people have many types of families. Porundia, or nuclear families, are a very common type. They normally have 2 or more children. In a typical Fur family the parents of the groom and wife will be taken care of until they die.

In a Fur marriage, the groom's father goes to the bride's father and asks for his son's permission to marry. The bride's father does not give an answer immediately, but then asks the village for its opinion. If everyone approves, the bride's father accepts. The whole village gathers for the announcement of the marriage, and preparations are made. Then the marriage starts in the groom's house. The imam recites words from the Quran. The groom and bride hold hands during this time. After the wedding, the family and guests have lunch, then they start a lively dance called firalubia. Then the bride and groom are taken to the bride's house and given food during which everyone says congratulations (mabrouk in Arabic).

Institutions

Islam is the major religion among the Fur people, although some still practice their own religion. The schools called (Kalwa) in this region teach the Quran. Classes begin at 6–7 years and they continue learning the Quran (though not entirely in school) for the rest of their lives. Normal schooling is also practiced in these schools.

The main occupation here is farming. The Fur people are excellent farmers. They grow and harvest wheat, herbs, spices, etc. Wealth is not really important for the Fur people. Only his knowledge of the Quran determines his altitude.

History

The Fur people came from southern Africa, specifically Central African Republic to the northwest of Sudan, where they settled in Darfur. They had 36 sultanates. The Fur were also one of the first people from other ethnic groups in the country who were picked to build the wall covering and mosque surrounding the Kaaba.Moreover, they managed to send conveys informs of aid every year to Makkah.

Political situation

Until 1916, the Fur were ruled by an independent sultanate and were oriented politically to peoples in Chad. Though the ruling dynasty before that time, as well as the common people, had long been Muslims they have not been arabized. They are now incorporated into the Sudan political system. 
The Fur had been basically independent from the 17th century. After British reconquest in 1899, the British approved the re-establishment of the Fur Sultanate, assumed by Ali Dinar when the Mahdist movement crumbled.

Mahdist revolts continued to break out in Sudan until 1916. The fall of Darfur was decided when Ali Dinar declared loyalty to the Ottoman Empire in World War I. The British abolished the Fur Sultanate in 1916 after Dinar died in battle.

In World War I Darfur made a bid for independence by allying with Turkey against the British. The British conquered Darfur in 1916, and since then it has been part of Sudan. Since the 1970s, the Darfur area has suffered some of the effects of the northern Arab war prosecuted in the south against Southern ethnic groups who wanted to secede from the Sudan.

War has been the primary factor in the last few decades of the Darfur area. A civil war lasted about 20 years until the end of the 20th Century. A new conflict arose in 2003, involving local Arab militia called Janjaweed attacking the African peoples village by village in a campaign of terror, reportedly supported by the Sudanese military.

Genetics
Analysis of classic genetic markers and DNA polymorphisms by Tay and Saha (1988) found that the Fur are most closely related to the Hawazma of Sudan. Both populations have gene frequencies intermediate between those of the Afro-Asiatic-speaking Beja, Gaalin and Gulf Arab populations and those of the local Nilo-Saharan-speaking Nuba and Nilotes.

According to Hassan et al. (2008), around 59.4% of Fur are carriers of the E1b1b paternal haplogroup. Of these, 68.4% bear the V32 subclade. Approximately 6.3% also belong to the haplogroup J1. This points to significant patrilineal gene flow from neighbouring Afro-Asiatic-speaking populations. The remaining Fur individuals are primarily carriers of the A3b2 lineage (31.3%), which is instead common among Nilotes.

Maternally, the Fur entirely belong to African-based derivatives of the macrohaplogroup L according to Hassan (2010). Of these mtDNA clades, the L0a1 (15.3%) and L1c (11.5%) lineages are most frequent. This altogether suggests that the genetic introgression into the Fur's ancestral population was asymmetrical, occurring primarily through Afro-Asiatic-speaking males rather than females.

References

External links
 

Ethnic groups in Chad
Ethnic groups in Sudan
Darfur
Society of Sudan
African diaspora
Muslim communities in Africa